Sha'alvim is a religious kibbutz in central Israel and one of only two affiliated with Poalei Agudat Yisrael (Hafetz Haim being the other). Located near the city of Modi'in-Maccabim-Re'ut, it falls under the jurisdiction of Gezer Regional Council.

History
During the 18th and 19th centuries, the area of Sha'alvim belonged to the Nahiyeh (sub-district) of Lod that encompassed the area of the present-day city of Modi'in-Maccabim-Re'ut in the south to the present-day city of El’ad in the north, and from the foothills in the east, through the Lod Valley to the outskirts of Jaffa in the west. This area was home to thousands of inhabitants in about 20 villages, who had at their disposal tens of thousands of hectares of prime agricultural land.

The kibbutz was founded on 13 August 1951 by a Nahal group from the Ezra movement, on lands of the depopulated Palestinian village of Salbit.  It was named after a biblical location mentioned in Joshua. Judges, and Kings, probably located here. The hill between the kibbutz and Nof Ayalon is commonly known as Tel Sha'alvim. Until the Six-Day War it was a target of numerous attacks from the West Bank due to its proximity to the Green Line. According to a document captured from the Jordanian Arab Legion, the legion was planning to attack the village and massacre all its residents.

In 1961, a yeshiva, Yeshivat Sha'alvim, was founded in Sha'alvim, and later became a large regional religious education facility.

References

Kibbutzim
Nahal settlements
Populated places established in 1951
Religious Israeli communities
Populated places in Central District (Israel)
1951 establishments in Israel